Christoph Sahner (born September 23, 1963 in Illingen) is a retired male hammer thrower, who represented West Germany during his career.

His personal best throw was 81.78 metres, achieved in September 1988 in Wemmetsweiler. This ranks him sixth among German hammer throwers, behind Ralf Haber, Heinz Weis, Karsten Kobs, Günther Rodehau and Holger Klose.

International competitions

References

1963 births
Living people
Sportspeople from Saarland
German male hammer throwers
West German male hammer throwers
Olympic athletes of West Germany
Athletes (track and field) at the 1984 Summer Olympics
Athletes (track and field) at the 1988 Summer Olympics
World Athletics Championships athletes for West Germany
People from Neunkirchen (German district)